The 14th People's Representative Council , consisting of the Golkar, PDI, PPP, and the military fraction, was the last People's Representative Council (DPR) during the  New Order Era. The legislative convened for only two years, and was the second shortest DPR, second only to the Transitional People's Representative Council.

The 14th DPR also participated in the downfall of Suharto, with the speaker of the DPR, Harmoko, frequently urged the president to step down.

Politics of Indonesia